The Freedom/Orlando Classic was a golf tournament on the LPGA Tour from 1979 to 1984. It was played in the Orlando, Florida area: at the Rio Pinar Country Club from 1979 to 1982 and at the Cypress Creek Country Club from 1983 to 1984.

Winners
Freedom/Orlando Classic
1984 Betsy King

Combanks Orlando Classic
1983 Lynn Adams

Orlando Lady Classic
1982 Patty Sheehan

Florida Lady Citrus
1981 Beth Daniel
1980 Donna White
1979 Jane Blalock

References

External links
Tournament results at Golfobserver.com
Rio Pinar Country Club
Cypress Creek Country Club

Former LPGA Tour events
Golf in Orlando, Florida
20th century in Orlando, Florida
Recurring sporting events established in 1979
Recurring sporting events disestablished in 1984
1979 establishments in Florida
1984 disestablishments in Florida
Women's sports in Florida